Minyichthys brachyrhinus is a species of marine fish belonging to the family Syngnathidae.

Geography 
They can be found in the coastal waters of Indonesia, Sumatra, the Philippines, Fiji, and Hawaii, though little is known about their preferred habitat in these areas.

Diet 
Their diet likely consists of small crustaceans such as copepods, amphipods, and mysid shrimps.

Reproduction 
Reproduction occurs through ovoviviparity in which the males brood eggs before giving live birth.

References

External links 

 Minyichthys brachyrhinus at FishBase

Syngnathidae
Taxa named by Earl Stannard Herald
Fish described in 1953